ILOG S.A. was an international software company purchased and incorporated into IBM announced in January, 2009. It created enterprise software products for supply chain, business rule management, visualization and optimization.  The main product line for Business Rules Management Systems (BRMS) has been rebranded as IBM Operational Decision Management.  Many of the related components retain the ILOG brand as a part of their name. 

The software developed by the ILOG software company supports several software platforms, including COBOL, C++, C#, .NET, Java, AJAX and Adobe Flex and Flex AIR.

Founded in 1987 in Paris, France, ILOG had its main headquarters in Gentilly, France, and Sunnyvale, California. 
It also had main offices in Australia, China, Germany, Japan, Singapore and the United Kingdom.

Through its acquisition of CPLEX Optimization Inc. in 1997, ILOG became the owner of the CPLEX mathematical programming software, and ILOG's acquisition of LogicTools in 2007 made ILOG the owner of a line of supply chain applications.  The CPLEX and other tools also had some minor rebranding under the IBM Optimization Suite of tools.

Products
ILOG's main products:
 IBM WebSphere ILOG JRules, a business rule management system (BRMS) that enables both business and IT users to write and maintain the logic applied by applications that automatically implement decisions.
 IBM ILOG Views, a visualization development system and toolkit based on C++ with add ons for charts, maps and reactive graphic objects. This product still exists as Rogue Wave Software Views.
 IBM ILOG CPLEX, optimization software for mathematical programming
 IBM ILOG JViews, a visualization development system based on Java and supported with add-ons for Gantt charts, graphs, maps and diagrams
 IBM ILOG Elixir component sets for Adobe AIR and Adobe Flex platforms
 IBM ILOG Supply Chain Apps
 ILOG Solver was considered the market leader in commercial constraint programming software as of 2006.

Company 
ILOG was an international software company. It developed, marketed, sold and supported BRMS, optimization and visualization software components, as well as supply chain applications. ILOG had business locations in nine countries, but it had two principal locations incorporated into IBM:
 France: Gentilly, a small town just outside Paris
 United States: Sunnyvale, California, south of San Francisco

History 
The name ILOG is an abbreviation of the combination of two French words: "Intelligence" and "Logiciel".  These words can be translated as "Intelligent Software."

In 1987, ILOG began licensing software components to companies developing software applications. These customers licensed the components in order to add new functionality to their software applications. The software components were initially developed in the LISP programming language, and transitioned to C++ in 1992 in order to follow the technical evolution of the software industry.

ILOG introduced two new products in 1993: ILOG Views and ILOG Solver. ILOG customers use them to make visualization interfaces (Views) and resources allocation applications (Solver). Until 1995, ILOG sales were concentrated in Europe, particularly in France. In 1995, the  company started to expand globally by establishing a major sales presence in the United States and Asia.

In 1997 Apr 19, it acquired CPLEX Optimization, Inc. (CPLEX), located in Incline Village,
Nevada, which provided linear-based optimization software products for the supply chain industry. In the late 1990s, ILOG started to introduce Java versions of its products to follow once again the software industry’s technical evolution. It
also introduced a business rule management system (BRMS) product in 1996, which gives software engineers the ability to better manage the rules operating their applications.
The financial services sector has been the primary market for ILOG's BRMS products, for use in developing, for example, online trading or credit decision making applications. ILOG's BRMS product line is currently the company's largest product line.

ILOG also introduced a C# version of some of its visualization products in fiscal year 2004 and of their BRMS products in fiscal year 2005.

Until ILOG's initial public offering in 1997 on the NASDAQ National Market (which subsequently became the Nasdaq Stock Market on August 1, 2006), ILOG was financed through a combination of retained earnings, venture capital funding and interest free loans from French government agencies and the European Union. This initial public offering enabled ILOG to acquire CPLEX.

In 1998, SAP A.G. invested in ILOG.  The financing from SAP was part of the partnership that has made SAP ILOG's biggest customer every year to date. This partnership, along with others, made ILOG a player in the supply chain management market. In 1998, ILOG listed on the Nouveau marché of Euronext Paris and in 2005 transferred to Eurolist by Euronext Paris.

Recent developments 
On October 26, 2006, ILOG acquired 35% of the capital and voting rights of the Chinese company Shanghai FirstTech Co., Ltd. (FirstTech). FirstTech is a systems integrator that
develops and markets manufacturing and insurance solutions in the Chinese market.

On November 20, 2006, ILOG acquired one-third of the capital and voting rights of Prima Solutions (Prima), a Paris-based supplier of software platforms for the insurance sector.

On April 11, 2007, ILOG completed the acquisition of LogicTools, a Chicago-based provider of supply chain planning applications specializing in network design and
inventory optimization. LogicTools’ applications are based on the ILOG CPLEX
optimization product.

On July 28, 2008, IBM and ILOG announced an agreement regarding a proposed acquisition by IBM of ILOG.

On January 6, 2009, the acquisition of ILOG by IBM was completed.

On July 1, 2009, the "Transfer of Business" letter was issued that confirmed that ILOG was effectively integrated within IBM. This coincided with a fresh release of the ILOG products, which is now branded as an IBM ILOG company.

Customers
As of 2009, more than 1,000 universities use ILOG Optimization for research and teaching, and more than 1,000 commercial customers, including over 160 of the Global 500, use ILOG Optimization in some of their most important planning and scheduling applications.

References

External links 
 Official ILOG Web site
 Official IBM ODB Web site

Software companies of France
IBM subsidiaries
Constraint programming